This list of 2012 NFL draft early entrants consists of college football players who were juniors or redshirt sophomores and were declared eligible to be selected in the 2012 NFL draft. A college football player who completed high school at least three years prior can renounce his remaining NCAA eligibility and enter the draft. Players who met these requirements had until January 15, 2012, to declare their intention to forgo their remaining collegiate eligibility.

A total of 65 underclassmen were granted eligibility for the 2012 draft, eclipsing the previous record from 2011 of 56. In addition to these underclassmen, at least three players who were considered seniors opted not to pursue an additional season of college eligibility for which they may have been eligible.

Complete list of players

The following players were granted special eligibility to enter the 2012 draft:

 Notes

 This player is a third-year sophomore.
 This player in not technically an underclassman, but he has opted to forego an additional season of college eligibility.

Number of players granted special eligibility by year
Undergraduates admitted to the NFL draft each year:

References

External links 
 2012 NFL Draft

2012 NFL draft early entrants
Draft early entrants